The 2010–11 FA Cup qualifying rounds opened the 130th season of competition in England for 'The Football Association Challenge Cup' (FA Cup), the world's oldest association football single knockout competition. A total of 759 clubs were accepted for the competition, down three from the previous season's 762.

The large number of clubs entering the tournament from lower down (Levels 5 through 10) in the English football pyramid meant that the competition started with six rounds of preliminary (2) and qualifying (4) knockouts for these non-League teams. The 32 winning teams from the fourth round qualifying progressed to the First round proper, where League teams tiered at Levels 3 and 4 entered the competition.

Calendar and prizes
The calendar of the 2010–11 FA Cup qualifying rounds, as announced by The FA.

Extra preliminary round
Extra preliminary round ties were played on the weekend of 14 August 2010. 402 clubs from Level 9 and Level 10 of English football, entered at this stage of the competition.

Preliminary round
Preliminary round fixtures were played on the weekend of 28 August 2010. A total of 332 clubs took part in this stage of the competition, including the 201 winners from the Extra preliminary round, Ashford Town, who were without a league to compete but were included in a draw, and 130 entering at this stage from the six leagues at Level 8 of English football, except three clubs: Chester who was ineligible to participate as they only spent their second season, Leyton, who decided not to participate, and Grays Athletic, who get a bye to the next stage. The round featured 55 clubs from Level 10 still in the competition, being the lowest-ranked teams in this round.

First round qualifying
The first round qualifying fixtures were played on the weekend of 11 September 2010, with replays being played the following mid-week. A total of 232 clubs took part in this stage of the competition, including the 166 winners from the Preliminary round, 65 entering at this stage from the top division of the three leagues at Level 7 of English football and Grays Athletic, while Halesowen Town from Southern League Premier Division missing this years competition due to ownership issues. The round featured 21 clubs from Level 10 still in the competition, being the lowest-ranked clubs in this round.

Second round qualifying
The second round qualifying fixtures were played on the weekend of 25 September 2010. A total of 160 clubs took part in this stage of the competition, including the 116 winners from the first round qualifying and 44 Level 6 clubs, from Conference North and Conference South, entering at this stage. Radcliffe Olympic and Wednesfield from Level 10 of English football, were the lowest-ranked clubs to qualify for this round of the competition.

Third round qualifying
The third round qualifying took place on the weekend of 9 October 2010. A total of 80 clubs took part, all having progressed from the second round qualifying. Radcliffe Olympic from Level 10 of English football was the lowest-ranked club to qualify for this round of the competition.

Fourth round qualifying
The fourth round qualifying took place on the weekend of 23 October 2010. A total of 64 clubs took part, 40 having progressed from the third round qualifying and 24 clubs from Conference Premier, forming Level 5 of English football, entering at this stage. Tipton Town, Poole Town, Hythe Town and Leiston from Level 9 of English football were the lowest-ranked clubs to qualify for this round of the competition.

Competition proper

Winners from the fourth round qualifying advanced to the first round proper, where clubs from Level 3 and Level 4 of English football, operating in The Football League, first enter the competition. See 2010–11 FA Cup for a report of First round proper onwards.

References

External links
 The FA Cup Archive

Qualifying
FA Cup qualifying rounds